Gwallon is a hamlet in the parish of Marazion, Cornwall, England. It is in the civil parish of St Hilary.

References

Hamlets in Cornwall